Amazing-Man (John Aman) is a fictional, American comic book superhero whose adventures were published by Centaur Publications during the 1930s to 1940s in the Golden Age of Comic Books. Historians credit his creation variously to writer-artist Bill Everett or to Everett together with Centaur art director Lloyd Jacquet. Amazing-Man first appeared in Amazing-Man Comics #5 (Sept. 1939) (there were no issues numbered #1-4).

During the Golden Age of Comic Books, Centaur Publications produced Amazing-Man's eponymous series, Amazing-Man Comics, which ran from issues #5–26 (Sept. 1939 – Feb. 1942). Amazing-Man was the second superhero to have a comic book named after him, after Superman. In 1941, Centaur also included Amazing-Man in their war comic, Stars and Stripes Comics #2-6 (June — Dec. 1941). The book was cancelled in 1942 when the company went out of business.

The character influenced the creation and origin of Charlton Comics' 1960s superhero Peter Cannon, Thunderbolt, as well as Marvel Comics' Iron Fist character in the 1970s, and DC Comics' hero of the same name.

Development
In a letter from Everett's wife, Grace she revealed that the character was created in response to the national periodical character, Superman. "I’m going to spend all day tomorrow at the Public Library, doing some research work for Bill. He has a new character, for a strip which Jaquet wants him to do in competition with the new one now being syndicated – called the “Superman’ I think. We’ve wracked our brains for a new kind of character; and all I can think of now is to back over some old folk tales, foreign ones if necessary, and try to find some unusual character around which we can build an unusual story for these modern times."

Fictional character biography

John Aman is an orphan from the West, chosen for his "superb physical structure" to be raised by benevolent monks in Tibet for the first 25 years of his life. Each member of The Council of Seven, as the monks are known, trained him to a superhuman degree of physical and mental ability, while also giving him the ability via a chemical solution to disappear into a cloud of green mist, earning him the secondary title of the Green Mist. His new powers include super-strength, invulnerability and speed, as well as healing and telekensis.

After receiving his final tests, he is sent into the world to use his skills and abilities to do good. Opposing Aman, as he was often known, is his nemesis the Great Question, a disgruntled member of the Council of Seven. Aman's sidekick is Tommy, the Amazing Kid, and he's also aided by "ace girl crime investigator" Zona Henderson.

Malibu Comics

In the 1990s, Malibu Comics used the Centaur properties, including Amazing-Man, as the roster of its own superhero team, the Protectors. Aside from the costume, the Malibu version was essentially identical to the original.

Marvel Comics version
Amazing-Man was introduced into the Marvel Comics universe, with the character Prince of Orphans revealing his identity as John Aman at the end of Immortal Iron Fist #12 (Feb. 2008). Earlier in the issue, Prince of Orphans is seen turning into a green mist while battling Davos.

Aman had been sent by the Seven Cities of Heaven to assassinate Orson Randall (the Iron Fist before the present day Danny Rand took on that mantle) in order to kill another "immortal weapon" like himself. Chasing Randall around the world, Aman would come close to killing his foe, only to yield honorably when Randall's allies would be injured. Eventually, Randall hinted that the masters of the Seven Cities had lied to Aman concerning the Tournament of the Seven Cities, in which every decade the victorious city is allowed to merge with the Earthly plane. Feeling betrayed after discovering the cities' masters had developed gateways to Earth without the knowledge of the cities' populace, Aman dropped his quest against Randall and vowed to make the city masters pay. Randall told Aman to assist the next Iron Fist in a revolution against the Seven Cities.

The character later appeared in Secret Avengers #6–12 as the Prince of Orphans, to assist the Secret Avengers against the Shadow Council; Aman stopped the Shadow Council from resurrecting Zheng Zu (Shang-Chi's fanther). During this, it is revealed he met Captain America (Steve Rogers) during World War II.

During the 2011 "Fear Itself" storyline, Prince of Orphans appears in Washington D.C. during Blitzkrieg U.S.A, helping with the rescue efforts, alongside War Machine, Beast and Ant-Man. He tells War Machine that the "Eighth City" has been opened.

The character appeared as an antagonist in Matt Fraction's Defenders in 2012.

Other versions
Under his original name, Amazing-Man is one of many public domain superheroes to appear in issue #0 of Project Superpowers, a miniseries from Dynamite Entertainment; a sketch of him is included in issue #2.

In 2014, Barry Gregory and Steven Butler released a new series by Gallant Comics. The new series, titled John Aman Amazing Man, Gregory and Butler used other public domain characters, like Blue Beetle and Miss Masque. In 2015, they launched a crowdfunding campaign in Kickstarter to finish a six-part arc.

Notes

External links

 
 

 Amazing-Man at Comic Vine
 Prince of Orphans at Comic Vine
 A Hero History Of Amazing-Man
 Who is the Amazing Man?

Centaur Publications titles
Centaur Publications characters
Comics characters introduced in 1939
1939 comics debuts
Malibu Comics titles
Protectors characters
Golden Age superheroes
Characters created by Bill Everett
Marvel Comics male characters
Avengers (comics) characters